Sidekicks (also known as Rainbow Carousel) is an album by Tom Fogerty and Randy Oda (who previously worked together in the rock band Ruby). The album was recorded in 1988 and released in 1992 on Fantasy Records, two years after Fogerty's death in 1990. Due to its posthumous release, Sidekicks stands as Fogerty's final album.

Background
During spring 1988, Fogerty and Oda reunited to work on new material for the album that would become Sidekicks. Recorded at Studio D at Fantasy Studios in Berkeley, additional overdubs were recorded at Chaton Recording in Scottsdale. The project saw Fogerty's son Jeff and Oda's brother Kevin on bass and drums respectively. After completing half of the album, Fogerty and Oda agreed to return to the studio at a later date so that Fogerty could spend more time with his newly-born daughter. However, soon after, Fogerty fell ill with pneumonia and was diagnosed with AIDS; believed to have been from an unscreened blood transfusion during Fogerty's back surgery earlier in the decade. After recovering from the pneumonia, Fogerty was able to continue working on Sidekicks.

In the album's liner notes, Fogerty's wife Trish said: 

After its completion, Fantasy Records decided not to release the album. Fogerty died of AIDS-related tuberculosis in September 1990, and Sidekicks would be posthumously released by Fantasy in 1992. In Germany, the album was released by Line Records. For this version, the artist name was changed to "Sidekicks" and the title Rainbow Carousel. In preparation for its release, the album was digitally remastered by George Horn at Fantasy Studios during the same year.

Track listing
All tracks written by Tom Fogerty and Randy Oda, except where noted.
 "Rainbow Carousel" – 7:40
 "Money Buys It (Funky Side of Town)" – 3:00
 "Video Girl" – 4:40
 "Woman of the Year" – 4:12
 "Clearwater Rain" – 2:56
 "Teardrops" – 4:03
 "We've Been Here Before" – 4:26
 "Sometimes" – 4:42
 "Sloop John B." (Traditional) – 4:40
 "Unbearable Lightness of Being" (Fogerty) – 4:02

Personnel
Tom Fogerty – vocals, acoustic guitar, electric guitar, producer, arranger
Randy Oda – acoustic guitar, electric guitar, keyboards, producer, arranger
Jeff Fogerty – bass, backing vocals
Kevin Oda – drums, percussion, sequence programming
David Luke – chief engineer, co-mixing
Bob Ross – additional engineer, drum and keyboard sequencing
Tom Size, Steve Escallier, Mark Seagraves – additional engineers
George Horn – digital remastering
Paul Markow – photography

References

Tom Fogerty albums
1992 albums
Albums published posthumously
Fantasy Records albums